Athletics at the 2011 Pacific Games in Nouméa, New Caledonia was held on September 3–10, 2011.

For the first time at the Pacific Games, four parasport events were also included: Men's Shot Put – seated throw, Women's Shot Put – seated throw, Men's Javelin – ambulatory, and Men's 100m – ambulatory.

Medal table

Medal summary

Men

Women

References

See also
 Athletics at the Pacific Games

External links
Athletics at the 2011 Pacific Games

2011 Pacific Games
Athletics at the Pacific Games
Pacific Games